Verkhnecherensky is a rural locality (a khutor) and the administrative center of Verkhnecherenskoye Rural Settlement, Kletsky District, Volgograd Oblast, Russia. The population was 881 as of 2010. There are 24 streets.

Geography 
Verkhnecherensky is located in steppe, on the bank of the Kurtlak River, 39 km southwest of Kletskaya (the district's administrative centre) by road. Novotsaritsynsky is the nearest rural locality.

References 

Rural localities in Kletsky District